Szadłowice is a village in Inowrocław County, Kuyavian-Pomeranian Voivodeship, in north-central Poland.

The village has a population of 410.

References

Villages in Inowrocław County